The Teacher is a 1974 American coming-of-age erotic thriller film written, produced, and directed by Hikmet Avedis in 12 days for an estimated $65,000 and released by Crown International Pictures. The film is Avedis' grindhouse homage to 1967's The Graduate.

The film stars Angel Tompkins, Jay North, and Anthony James, and tells the story of an 18-year-old's first relationship with his alluring teacher, and the hidden danger awaiting them in the shadows.

Plot
It is summer, and obsessed Ralph Gordon (Anthony James) stalks a high-school teacher, 28-year-old Diane Marshall (Angel Tompkins). He watches her from an old warehouse while she is relaxing in her swimsuit on one of the boats. One of Diane's students, 18-year-old Sean Roberts (Jay North) and Ralph's younger brother Lou (Rudy Herrera, Jr.), also watch her strip naked and exercise. An angry Ralph yells at them, brandishing a bayonet. Shocked at this, Lou falls over the railing to his death, for which Ralph falsely blames Sean.

Later that night, Ralph confronts Sean again, threatening to cut the boy's tongue out should he reveal anything. The sheriff questions Sean, who lies due to seeing Ralph eyeing him. The next day, Sean meets with Diane, who invites him to have tea. Diane reveals that she knows about Ralph stalking her. On their way home, Sean and she see Ralph watching them. Diane invites Sean into her house for a drink. This soon escalates into a moment of passionate lovemaking while Ralph, unknown to them, watches jealously.

Diane invites Sean to her boat the next day. Ralph arrives and threatens Sean with a handheld harpoon. However, upon seeing Diane, he flees. Diane later asks Sean to dinner, after which Ralph again threatens him with the bayonet. Diane then tells Sean's parents about Ralph's threats. The next day, Sean drives Diane home and they have a pool party together, then make love. Diane receives a phone call from her drifter husband telling her that he is coming back, but Diane tells him she is divorcing him.

As Sean gets into his van to drive home, he is held at bayonet point by Ralph and ordered to drive to the warehouse. Sean manages to get away and arms himself with a rifle, but Ralph reveals that the gun is loaded with blanks. Ralph gets him in a chokehold, which ends up killing him. Diane arrives on the scene, where Ralph tells her that he killed Sean so he can be with her. A horrified Diane pleads tearfully with him. Ralph, overcome with anger and jealousy at Diane's love for Sean over himself, tries to strangle her. Diane manages to stab him with his own bayonet and flees crying, leaving Ralph to bleed to death. Diane finds Sean's body, breaks down and weeps.

Cast
Angel Tompkins ... Diane Marshall
Jay North ... Sean Roberts
Anthony James ... Ralph Gordon
Marlene Schmidt ... Alice Roberts
Barry Atwater ... Sheriff Murphy
Med Flory ... Joe Roberts
Rudy Herrera Jr. ... Lou Gordon
Quinn O'Hara ... Margaret Parker
Sivi Aberg	... Bonnie Nelson
Richard Winterstein ... Russell Marshall
Katherine Cassavetes ... Gossiping Lady 1
Lady Rowlands ... Gossiping Lady 2
Cassandra Lucas ... Waitress

Reception
Although 22 years old during principal production, North was still largely known to audiences as the impish child he had played 10 years before on the CBS family series Dennis the Menace.  Prior to the release of the film, columnist Jack O'Brian reported of the "vulgarity" of North's first adult feature film role: "Nice little Jay North (TV's Dennis the Menace only a few smiles ago) has a bang-up role in 'The Teacher' flick -- an explicit porn-scene with Angel Tompkins."

While not impressed with what he deemed to be a "ludicrous" storyline, Los Angeles Times critic Kevin Thomas expressed appreciation for the portrayal of the film's two lead characters, writing:The plot of 'The Teacher' isn't worth outlining, yet it develops a relationship between a 28-year-old woman and an 18-year-old high school boy with sensitivity and credibility unusual for an exploitation film. [...]  Avedis displays much concern for his people and allows Miss Tompkins and North plenty of room to give fresh, spontaneous performances.

See also
 List of American films of 1974

References

External links
 
 

1974 films
1970s coming-of-age films
1970s erotic thriller films
1970s exploitation films
1970s psychological drama films
1970s psychological thriller films
1970s thriller drama films
1970s erotic drama films
Adultery in films
American coming-of-age films
American erotic thriller films
American exploitation films
American psychological thriller films
American thriller drama films
Crown International Pictures films
American erotic drama films
Films about murderers
Films about stalking
Films about scandalous teacher–student relationships
Films about virginity
1974 drama films
1970s English-language films
1970s American films